"Home" is a song recorded, written, and sung by Chandler Leighton and Rez and produced by American musician Salvatore Lodato. The track became Lodato's first number one on Billboard's Dance/Mix Show Airplay chart, reaching the summit in the November 16, 2019 issue.

Charts

References

External links
Official Video at YouTube

2019 songs
2019 singles